Buprestis octoguttata is a species of beetle native to Europe.

References

Buprestidae
Beetles described in 1758
Taxa named by Carl Linnaeus